The Chief Justice of Nepal is the head of the judicial branch of Nepal and the chief judge of the Supreme Court of Nepal. The Chief Justice is the highest judicial officer in the country, and acts as a chief administrative officer for all the judicial system.

The current acting Chief Justice is Hari Krishna Karki, who took over the role on 13 December 2022.

List of Chief Justices 
The list of Chief Justices of Nepal are as follows:

See also 
 Supreme Court of Nepal

References

Lists of office-holders in Nepal
1951 establishments in Nepal